The Forcible Entry Act 1381 (5 Ric 2 St 1 c 7) was an Act of the Parliament of the Kingdom of England. It created a statutory offence of forcible entry which superseded the common law offence.

It is written in the Anglo-Norman language. The original text (reproduced here in Roman script, without most accents in the original) is sourced from The Statutes, 1870 Revised Edition, Vol. I, p.227:Et Auxint le Roi defende q nully desore face entree en aucunes tres & teñz sinoun en cas ou entree est done p la loy, & en cell cas nemye a forte main ne a multitude des gentz, einz tantsoulement en [lisible & aisee] mane, et si nully desore face a contraire & ent soit convict duement soit puniz p emprisonment de son corps & dilloeqs reint a la voluntee le Roy.

It has been translated as follows:And also the King defendeth, that none from henceforth make any entry into lands and tenements, but in case where entry is given by the law; and in such case not with strong hand, nor with multitude of people, but only in [peaceable] and easy manner. And if any man from henceforth do the contrary, and thereof be duly convict, he shall be punished by imprisonment of his body, and thereof ransomed at the King's will.There were doubts about the interpretation of this Act. It was suggested that the words translated as "that none from henceforth make any entry into lands and tenements, but in case where entry is given by the law" should be construed as making any unauthorised entry an offence, even where peaceful. It appears that this was not the intention of those responsible for the Act, and the courts did not at any time construe it that way.

Republic of Ireland

This Act was applied to Ireland by Poynings' Law. This Act was retained for the Republic of Ireland by section 2(2)(a) of, and Part 2 of Schedule 1 to, the Statute Law Revision Act 2007.

See also
Forcible Entry Act

References
Halsbury's Statutes, Third Edition, volume 18, page 405

External links
List of legislative effects from the Irish Statute Book.

Acts of the Parliament of England
1381 in England
1380s in law